The Auto Alliance (AAM) is a defunct trade group of automobile manufacturers that operated in the United States. It was the leading advocacy group for the auto industry, representing 77% of all car and light truck sales in the United States.  The Auto Alliance was active in the areas of environment, energy and motor vehicle safety. In 2019, the Alliance was merged with the Association of Global Automakers to form the Alliance for Automotive Innovation. John Bozzella of Global Automakers became the new CEO.

History

The trade group formed on January 13, 1999, to replace the American Automobile Manufacturers Association, which had represented only American manufacturers.  The members of the Auto Alliance were:

 BMW Group
 Fiat Chrysler Automobiles
 Ford Motor Company
 General Motors
 Jaguar Land Rover
 Mazda
 Mercedes-Benz USA
 Mitsubishi Motors
 Porsche
 Toyota
 Volkswagen Group of America
 Volvo Car USA

Notable absents include Asian manufacturers Honda, Nissan, Hyundai and Subaru.

As an advocacy group for the automobile industry on public policy issues, an example of the alliance's activity includes sponsorship of the Transportation Data Center at the University of Michigan Transportation Research Institute (UMTRI).

Likewise, the alliance was active in political lobbying on behalf of the industry.  The alliance appealed, for instance, a district-court ruling in California in September 2007 that upheld states' ability to regulate exhaust emissions, the issue having a strong bearing on state and federal vehicle mileage regulations.  They also have weighed in on the federal government's new fuel economy and emissions standards proposals calling for other industries to do their part in helping to trim pollution and conserve energy. The Alliance opposes the Motor Vehicle Owners' Right to Repair Act.

In September 2009, the Alliance of Automobile Manufacturers joined the Obama administration and environmentalists in opposing an effort to bar the U.S. Environmental Protection Agency for one year from attempting to regulate green-house-gas emissions for power plants and other large sources, preferring a single nationwide set of rules, a main priority since 2002.

AAM suggested to the coming Trump government in November 2016 that the Corporate Average Fuel Economy (CAFE) fuel economy rules be reviewed and relaxed.

See also
 American Automotive Policy Council
 Association of Global Automakers

References

Automobile associations in the United States
Trade associations based in the United States
Advocacy groups in the United States
Organizations established in 1999